The 2022 Internazionali Femminili di Brescia was a professional tennis tournament played on outdoor clay courts. It was the thirteenth edition of the tournament which was part of the 2022 ITF Women's World Tennis Tour. It took place in Brescia, Italy between 30 May and 5 June 2022.

Singles main draw entrants

Seeds

 1 Rankings are as of 23 May 2022.

Other entrants
The following players received wildcards into the singles main draw:
  Gloria Ceschi
  Melania Delai
  Lisa Pigato
  Angelica Raggi

The following players received entry from the qualifying draw:
  Sara Cakarevic
  Diletta Cherubini
  Ángela Fita Boluda
  Nicole Fossa Huergo
  Yuliana Lizarazo
  Jazmín Ortenzi
  Julia Terziyska
  Aurora Zantedeschi

The following players received entry as lucky losers:
  Nuria Brancaccio
  Zhibek Kulambayeva

Champions

Singles

  Ángela Fita Boluda def.  Despina Papamichail, 6–2, 6–0

Doubles

  Nuria Brancaccio /  Lisa Pigato def.  Zhibek Kulambayeva /  Diāna Marcinkēviča, 6–4, 6–1

References

External links
 2022 Internazionali Femminili di Brescia at ITFtennis.com

2022 ITF Women's World Tennis Tour
2022 in Italian tennis
May 2022 sports events in Italy
June 2022 sports events in Italy